Völkner or Volkner is a German-language surname and a derivative of the personal name Volk. It may refer to:

Carl Sylvius Völkner (c. 1819 – 1865), German-born Protestant missionary in New Zealand 
Christian Friedrich von Völkner (1728–1796), German translator and historian in Russia 
Iris Völkner (1960), German rower
Jirí Volkner (1931–2018), Czechoslovak sprint canoer

References 

Surnames from given names
German-language surnames